Paul Stanton Wylie (born October 28, 1964) is an American figure skater, and the 1992 Olympic silver medalist in men's singles skating.

Personal life
Paul Stanton Wylie was born on October 24, 1964 in Dallas, Texas to Bob Wylie (a geophysicist) and B.L. Wylie (a realtor) — the youngest of three children. In Dallas, he attended St. Mark's School of Texas. When he was eleven, his family moved to Denver, Colorado, where he focused increasingly on skating and graduated from Colorado Academy.

Wylie attended Harvard University and graduated in 1991 with a degree in government. After competing in the 1992 Winter Olympics, as he planned, he retired from amateur competition and began his professional skating career. It was his intention to tour for a few years and then go to law school. He was admitted to law school, but deferred attendance for a few years. He ended up skating professionally for six years before retiring. He then returned to Harvard — but to the Business School, rather than the Law School. He earned an MBA from Harvard Business School in 2000. He then worked for two years in marketing with The Walt Disney Company.

On August 14, 1999, Wylie married Kate Presbrey, a Cape Cod native and former Brown University Division 1 hockey player. They have three children, Hannah, Emma and Caleb. The family divides their time between Hyannis, Massachusetts and Charlotte, North Carolina, where Wylie previously worked with the Billy Graham Evangelistic Association as director of the Dare to be a Daniel program. Wylie currently runs High Gear Travel, a sports-related travel agency, and coaches figure skaters at the Extreme Ice Center in Indian Trail, North Carolina, owned by Tom Logano, father of NASCAR star Joey Logano, whose sister Danielle is also a coach.

Skating career 
Wylie started skating at the age of three. After moving to Denver, he began to train with Carlo Fassi. Wylie remained with Fassi for nine years, first in Denver and later in Colorado Springs when Fassi relocated to the Broadmoor Skating Club. As a young skater, Wylie additionally worked with John Curry and Robin Cousins, who were also students of Fassi. Cousins lived with the Wylie family while he was training for the 1980 Winter Olympics.

In 1979, Wylie won the novice men's title at the U.S. Championships, and in the 1981 season, he won both the U.S. junior title and the World Junior Championships. At the latter event, he landed his first triple jumps in competition—two triple toe loops.

At the same time, Wylie was competing in pair skating with partner Dana Graham. They won the junior pairs title at the 1980 U.S. nationals. They were coached by John Nicks, commuting to work with him in California. They placed eighth in the senior division at the 1981 U.S. nationals, but then dissolved their partnership when they lost financial sponsorship.

In 1985, wanting to rework some of his technique, Wylie left Fassi and began to train instead with Evy and Mary Scotvold, who were at that time located in Janesville, Wisconsin. Shortly afterwards, they all moved to the Boston area.

Wylie placed second at the U.S. Figure Skating Championships in 1988, 1990, and 1992. He won the silver medal at the 1992 Winter Olympics in Albertville, France. The medal was considered a major upset, as Wylie had never finished higher than ninth at the World Figure Skating Championships four years prior, and had skated such a poor performance at the 1992 U.S. Championships that reporters questioned his placement on the Olympic team. The USFSA had even left Wylie off the team for the 1992 World Championships, naming Mark Mitchell in his place.

After the Olympics, Wylie joined the professional skating ranks. He won the 1992 U.S. Open Professional Championship and the 1993 World Professional Figure Skating Championships. Wylie toured with Stars on Ice from 1992 to 1998 before retiring to attend graduate school and work in the corporate world.

After leaving his job at Disney in 2004, Wylie returned to the ice for 22 dates with Stars on Ice. He has also continued his long association with An Evening with Champions, the annual benefit show at Harvard. Wylie has worked as a sports commentator/analyst, most recently for ESPN and Universal Sports.

Wylie was inducted into the U.S. Figure Skating Hall of Fame on January 25, 2008.

Health 
While exercising with friends on April 21, 2015, Wylie collapsed and was unresponsive. One of the friends he was training with, Billy Griggs, was certified in CPR and immediately began chest compressions until medical attention arrived on scene. Paramedics administered a defibrillator but were unsuccessful in resuscitating Wylie. After first responders injected his heart with epinephrine, Wylie's heart started again. He was immediately transferred to Charlotte, North Carolina hospital where doctors diagnosed him as having suffered a sudden cardiac arrest. Wylie was put into a medically induced coma and began a treatment known as therapeutic hypothermia in order to cool his brain and body to 90 degrees in order to reduce any possible brain damage.

After two days, Wylie woke up from his coma and was released from the hospital nine days later. He has made a full recovery but continues to wear an implantable cardioverter-defibrillator pacemaker. He had no symptoms of heart disease except for experiencing a few dizzy spells a few days before the incident. Doctors gave Wylie a clean bill of health, saying he had no heart or brain damage.

Awards
 U.S. Olympic Spirit Award (1992)
 U.S. Figure Skating Hall of Fame Inductee (2008)

Professional competitive highlights 
 Ice Wars 1996 (team) 1st
 Battle of the Sexes 1996 (men's team) 1st
 Miko Masters 1996 1st
 Challenge of Champions 1995 1st
 Fall Team Pro-Am (team) 1st, 1st overall
 Ice Wars 1995 (team) 1st
 Miko Masters Paris Championships 1995 1st
 Ice Wars 1994 (team) 1st
 Spring Pro-Am 1994 1st
 World Challenge of Champions 1993 1st
 World Professional Figure Skating Championships 1993 1st
 Fall Pro-Am 3rd 1993 Miko Masters Paris Championships 1993 1st
 World Challenge of Champions 1992 1st
 U.S. Open Professional Championships 1992 1st
 Fall Pro-Am 1992 1st

Programs

Post-1992

Pre-1992

Results

See also

Notable alumni of St. Mark's School of Texas

Notes

References

 

 

 } 
 "Paul Wylie", Blades On Ice, August 1998.
 "Paul Wylie", Skating, November 1990.
 	 .

Navigation

1964 births
Living people
American male single skaters
Figure skaters at the 1988 Winter Olympics
Figure skaters at the 1992 Winter Olympics
Figure skating commentators
Olympic silver medalists for the United States in figure skating
Harvard Business School alumni
Olympic medalists in figure skating
Sportspeople from Denver
Sportspeople from Charlotte, North Carolina
People from Hyannis, Massachusetts
World Junior Figure Skating Championships medalists
Medalists at the 1992 Winter Olympics
Harvard College alumni
Sportspeople from Barnstable County, Massachusetts
Sportspeople from Dallas
Universiade medalists in figure skating
Disney people
St. Mark's School (Texas) alumni
Colorado Academy alumni
Universiade bronze medalists for the United States
Competitors at the 1987 Winter Universiade
Competitors at the 1990 Goodwill Games